MV Cape Knox (T-AKR-5082) was originally built and operated out of Rotterdam, the Netherlands by Nedlloyd Lines and was eventually sold to the United States Department of Transportation as a ready reserve vessel. Later the ship was transferred to the Ready Reserve Fleet. The ship is currently under care of Keystone Shipping Company, and is kept in ready reserve status. It can be mobilized with five days of notice.

References

 

Original Dutch Flag, operated by Neddloyd Lines in Rotterdam
Type:	Ro-Ro cargo - IMO: 7715290 - Callsign: PGEJ - Vlag: Nederland
Bouw:	1978, Nippon Kokan KK, Shimizi, Japan (nr. 97)
Specs:	LxBxH: 212.37 x 32.29 x 18.69 m. - 21.145 brt. - 1.550 TEU
Aandrijving:	2 tew 8 cil. Sulzer diesel - 26.800 pk (19.711 kW) - 19 kn

Short history:
1978 - Built as NEDLLOYD ROUEN for Nedlloyd Lijnen in Rotterdam.
1986 - renamed: ROUEN
1988 - renamed: NEDLLOYD ROUEN.
1995 - to Maritime Administration, Washington USA: CAPE KNOX.

External links
 Vessel Military Sealift Command Ship Inventory:  MV Cape Knox
 Navsource catalog

Rescue and salvage ships of the United States Navy
1978 ships